Shanghai Film Group Corporation is a film, animation and documentary production company under the Shanghai Media & Entertainment Group conglomerate.  In 2001, it was announced to be a combination of a number of studios, all of which are located in Shanghai, China.

History
Many of the individual entertainment production hubs were the center of art and culture for the country going as far back as the 1890s.  After the establishment of the People's Republic of China in 1950, numerous studios were established in session all around Shanghai.  Many would merge with smaller companies that offer similar functions.

By January 2017, Shanghai Film Group was the second largest film exhibitor in China behind Dalian Wanda Group. On January 19, 2017, Shanghai Film Group Corp. and Huahua Media said they would finance at least 25% of all Paramount Pictures movies over a three-year period. Shanghai Film Group and Huahua Media, in the deal, would help distribute and market Paramount's features in China.

Studios today
While all the studios are located in Shanghai, they do not all function within the same facility.  A number of studios have gone through different name changes throughout the years.  Shanghai Film Studio has been the main component for the company.

Properties
 SFG owns additional groups to carry out marketing, film rental, tech support, and other hi-tech labs functions.
 SFG owns 5 large film production enterprises, 14 TV-series productions enterprises with a large filming facility as of 2006.
 Owns the East-Movie-Channel.
 They have the largest cinema circuit in China with 75 cinemas and 198 screens, "Shanghai United Circuit’s" box office in 2003 and 2004 was topping the list in China.
 Currently SFG owns over 640 feature films, 30,000 mins of animation films, 1,555 documentary films and about 10,000 episodes of TV series.

Corporate goals
In three year's time, it plans to produce 20 feature films, 50 TV films and 800 episodes of TV series per year. The sales of its cinema circuit are targeted to be 25% of the China with a yearly revenue of 1.5 billion RMB (about US$80 million).

References

External links
Official Site of "Shanghai Film Studio" and company
Official Site of "Shanghai Animation Film Studio"

Government-owned companies of China
Film production companies of China
Chinese companies established in 2001
Companies based in Shanghai